TPZ may refer to:

Tirapazamine, experimental anticancer drug
Tula Cartridge Works (Tulskiy Patronniy Zavod), Russian ammunition manufacturer
TPz Fuchs, armoured personnel carrier developed by Daimler-Benz